Gastón Giani  (born 26 April 1979) is a former Argentine male volleyball player. He was part of the Argentina men's national volleyball team. He competed with the national team at the 2004 Summer Olympics in Athens, Greece. He played with Tenerife in 2004.

Clubs
   Tenerife (2004)

See also
 Argentina at the 2004 Summer Olympics

References

External links
 profile at FIVB.org

1979 births
Living people
Argentine men's volleyball players
Volleyball players at the 2004 Summer Olympics
Olympic volleyball players of Argentina
Volleyball players at the 2007 Pan American Games
Pan American Games competitors for Argentina
Place of birth missing (living people)
21st-century Argentine people